Gomiz (also Romanized as Gomīz; also known as Komīz) is a village in Saruq Rural District, Saruq District, Farahan County, Markazi Province, Iran. At the 2006 census, its population was 21, in 5 families.

References 

Populated places in Farahan County